Vidago Palace is a 2017 Portuguese mini-series, which originally aired on RTP1 and TVG. The show is a historical drama set in 1936; the series was both set and filmed in the Vidago Palace Hotel in Vidago. The plot follows a love triangle focused on Mikaela Lupu's Carlota and centers on class conflict. The series was RTP1's highest rated in three years.

Cast

References

2017 Portuguese television series debuts
2017 Portuguese television series endings